Serge Beucherie (born 17 January 1955) is a former French racing cyclist. He won the French national road race title in 1981.He raced as a professional racing cyclist from 1978 to 1984. He accumulated a total of 9 victories.

He was part of many cycling teams throughout the years: Fiat (French) (from 1978 to 1979), Sem-France-Loire-Campagnolo (from 1981 to 1983), Coop - Hoonved - Rossin (1984), and Rustines (1894).

References

External links

1955 births
Living people
French male cyclists
Cyclists from Paris